Kamla Nehru Prani Sangrahalaya or Indore Zoo is a zoological garden located in Navlakha, Indore is  managed by Indore Municipal Corporation. Indore zoo is the only zoo to deploy online booking (https://knpsi.in), animal-health app, and touchless entry system that is tightly integrated with e-Nagarpalika, making it the most advanced zoo of India.

This is the largest zoological garden of the state and one of the oldest zoological parks of Madhya Pradesh spread over an area of 210335 sq m.

Kamla Nehru Prani Sangrahlaya is one of the recognized zoos out of total 180 recognized zoos in India.
The zoo has different varieties of animals and birds which have been brought from different parts of world. The zoo's attempts to breed White tigers, Royal Bengal tigers, Gharial, Himalayan bear and white peacock have been successful. Indore zoo is also a center for reproduction, protection and exhibition of animals, plants and their habitats.

History

In 1974 the Indore zoo was established in Navlakha area in only 17 acres land, later on in the year 1999 adjoining 32 acres land of Quadibag was "Acquired" by the zoo so present area of Indore zoo is 51 acres. The total area of Indore zoo is full of greenery where different variety of trees and other plants gives natural feeling of forest to the wild animals.

Fauna 
At present, Indore Zoo contains a variety of reptiles, mammals and birds. Herbivores mammal includes Indian elephant, hippopotamus, blackbuck, nilgai, spotted deer, sambar deer, and chinkara.

Bengal tiger, Asiatic lion, Indian leopard and jungle cat are the members of cat family.

The zoo also contain Indian wolf, jackal, Indian fox and striped hyena which are the members of dog family.

Other species of mammals include squirrel monkey, Hanuman langur, Rhesus macaque, sloth bear, raccoon, hedgehog, porcupine, and palm civet.

Indore Zoo has a variety of birds like peacock, white peacock, sarus crane, Lady Amherst's pheasant, Egyptian vulture, various species of lovebird, emu, ostrich, barn-owl, turkey, duck, guineafowl, rosy pelican, various species of parakeet, painted stork, black swan and mute swan.

Indore Zoo also houses mugger and gharial crocodiles which are native to Indian Subcontinent.

Snake House 
To boost the number of visitors, Indore Zoo has opened Snake House in November 2019. The idea behind constructing a separate snake house was to provide visitors an opportunity to see and differentiate among various species of snakes under one roof.

Presently there are variety of snakes. Venomous snakes include the member of "big four" (Indian Krait, Russell's Viper, Saw-scaled Viper and Indian Cobra) with Banded Krait, Bamboo Pit viper and Common vine snake.

Non-venomous snakes include Rat snake, Checkered Keelback and Banded Racer.

Red Sand Boa, Indian Rock Python, Burmese Python and Reticulated Python are some species of boa and python in Indore Zoo.

India's First Smart Zoo 
In 2017, Indore Zoo became the first smart zoo of India. Tourists could receive interesting facts about animals and birds when they came near them. Tourists were to install a free app named Accio – which showed interesting information about the animals. This made tourists appreciate the beauty and uniqueness of each and every animal, resulting in more immersive experience. Bluetooth and IoT technologies were used to make this happen. The project was launched in collaboration with a startup launched by 2 IIT Indore Computer Science Graduates, Shikhar Bansal and Ravi Shankar Bharti.

References 

Zoos in India
Parks in India
Memorials to Kamala Nehru
Tourist attractions in Indore
1974 establishments in Tamil Nadu
Zoos established in 1974